The RMS Queen Elizabeth was an ocean liner operated by Cunard Line. With  she provided weekly luxury liner service between Southampton in the United Kingdom and New York City in the United States, via Cherbourg in France.

While being constructed in the mid-1930s by John Brown and Company at Clydebank, Scotland, the build was known as Hull 552. She was launched on 27 September 1938 and named in honour of Queen Elizabeth, who was later known as the Queen Mother. She also has the distinction of being the largest-ever riveted ship by gross tonnage. She first entered service in February 1940 as a troopship in the Second World War, and it was not until October 1946 that she served in her intended role as an ocean liner.

With the decline in popularity of the transatlantic route, both ships were replaced by the smaller, more economical Queen Elizabeth 2, which made her maiden voyage in 1969. Queen Mary was retired from service on 9 December 1967, and sold to the city of Long Beach, California. Queen Elizabeth was retired after her final crossing to New York, on 8 December 1968. She was moved to Port Everglades, Florida, and converted to a tourist attraction, which opened in February 1969. The business was unsuccessful, and closed in August 1970. Finally, Queen Elizabeth was sold to Hong Kong businessman Tung Chao Yung, who intended to convert her into a floating university cruise ship called Seawise University. In 1972, whilst she was undergoing refurbishment in Hong Kong harbour, a fire broke out aboard under unexplained circumstances, and the ship was capsized by the water used to fight the fire. The following year the wreck was deemed an obstruction to shipping in the area, and in 1974 and 1975 was partially scrapped on site.

Design and construction

On the day RMS Queen Mary sailed on her maiden voyage, Cunard's chairman, Sir Percy Bates, informed his ship designers, headed by George Paterson, that it was time to start designing the planned second ship. The official contract between Cunard and government financiers was signed on 6 October 1936.

The new ship improved upon the design of Queen Mary with sufficient changes, including a reduction in the number of boilers to twelve instead of Queen Mary twenty-four, that the designers could discard one funnel and increase deck, cargo and passenger space. The two funnels were self-supporting and braced internally to give a cleaner-looking appearance. With the forward well deck omitted, a more refined hull shape was achieved, and a sharper, raked bow was added for a third bow-anchor point. She was to be eleven feet longer and 4,000 tons greater displacement than her older sibling, Queen Mary.

Queen Elizabeth was built on slipway four at John Brown & Company in Clydebank, Scotland, Great Britain. During her construction she was more commonly known by her shipyard number, Hull 552. The interiors were designed by a team of artists headed by the architect George Grey Wornum. Cunard's plan was for the ship to be launched in September 1938, with fitting-out intended to be complete for the ship to enter service in the spring of 1940. Queen Elizabeth herself performed the launching ceremony on 27 September 1938. Supposedly, the liner started to slide into the water before the Queen could officially launch her, and acting sharply, she managed to smash a bottle of Australian red over the liner's bow just before it slid out of reach. The ship was then sent for fitting out. It was announced that on 23 August 1939 King George VI and Queen Elizabeth were to visit the ship and tour the engine room and that 24 April 1940 was to be the proposed date of her maiden voyage. Due to the outbreak of the Second World War, these two events were postponed and Cunard's plans were shattered.

Queen Elizabeth sat at the fitting-out dock at the shipyard in her Cunard colours until 2 November 1939, when the Ministry of Shipping issued special licences to declare her seaworthy. On 29 December her engines were tested for the first time, running from 0900 to 1600 with the propellers disconnected to monitor her oil and steam operating temperatures and pressures. Two months later Cunard received a letter from Winston Churchill, then First Lord of the Admiralty, ordering the ship to leave Clydeside as soon as possible and "to keep away from the British Isles as long as the order was in force".

Second World War
At the start of the Second World War, it was decided that Queen Elizabeth was so vital to the war effort that she must not have her movements tracked by German spies operating in the Clydebank area. An elaborate ruse suggested to any German observers that she would sail to Southampton to complete her fitting-out. Another factor prompting Queen Elizabeths departure was the necessity to clear the fitting-out berth at the shipyard for the battleship , which was in need of its final fitting-out. Only the berth at John Brown could accommodate the King George V-class battleships.

One major factor that limited the ship's departure date was that there were only two spring tides that year that would see the water level high enough for Queen Elizabeth to leave the Clydebank shipyard, and German intelligence were aware of this fact. Parts were shipped to Southampton, and preparations were made to move the ship into the King George V Graving Dock when she arrived. The names of Brown's shipyard employees were booked to local hotels in Southampton to give a false trail of information, and Captain John Townley was appointed as her first master. Townley had previously commanded Aquitania on one voyage, and several of Cunard's smaller vessels before that. Townley and his hastily signed-on crew of four hundred Cunard personnel were told by a company representative before they left to pack for a voyage where they could be away from home for up to six months.

By the beginning of March 1940, Queen Elizabeth was ready for her secret voyage. The Cunard colours were painted over with battleship grey, and on the morning of 3 March, the ship quietly left her moorings in the Clyde and proceeded out of the river to sail further down the coast, where she was met by a King's Messenger, who presented sealed orders directly to the captain. While waiting for the messenger, the ship was refuelled; adjustments to the compass and some final testing of equipment were also carried out before she sailed to her secret destination.

Captain Townley discovered that he was to take the ship directly to New York in the then neutral United States without stopping, or even slowing to drop off the Southampton harbour pilot who had embarked on at Clydebank, and to maintain strict radio silence. Later that day, at the time when she was due to arrive at Southampton, the city was bombed by the Luftwaffe. Queen Elizabeth zigzagged across the Atlantic to elude German U-boats and took six days to reach New York at an average speed of 26 knots. In New York she found herself moored alongside both Queen Mary and the French Line's , the only time all three of the world's largest ocean liners were ever berthed together.
Captain Townley received two telegrams on his arrival, one from his wife congratulating him, and the other from Her Majesty Queen Elizabeth thanking him for the vessel's safe delivery. The ship was then secured so that no one could board her without prior permission, including port officials.

Queen Elizabeth left the port of New York on 13 November 1940 for Singapore to receive her troopship conversion. After two stops to refuel and replenish her stores in Trinidad and Cape Town, she arrived in Singapore's naval docks, where she was fitted with anti-aircraft guns, and her hull repainted grey.

As a troopship, Queen Elizabeth left Singapore on 11 February, and on 23 February 1942 Queen Elizabeth secretly arrived in Esquimalt, British Columbia, Canada. She underwent refit work in drydock adding accommodation and armaments, and three hundred naval ratings quickly painted the hull. In mid-March, carrying 8,000 American soldiers, Queen Elizabeth began a 7,700-mile voyage from San Francisco to Sydney, Australia. Initially she carried Australian troops to theatres of operation in Asia and Africa. After 1942, the two Queens were relocated to the North Atlantic for the transportation of American troops to Europe.

Queen Elizabeth and Queen Mary were both used as troop transports during the war. Their high speeds allowed them to outrun hazards, principally German U-boats, usually allowing them to travel outside a convoy.

Post-Second World War

Following the end of the Second World War, Queen Elizabeth was refitted and furnished as an ocean liner, while her running mate Queen Mary remained in her wartime role and grey appearance except for her funnels, which were repainted in the company's colours. For another year, her sibling did military service, returning troops and G.I. brides to the United States while Queen Elizabeth was overhauled at the Firth of Clyde Drydock, in Greenock, by the John Brown Shipyard.

Six years of war service had never permitted the formal sea trials to take place, so they were now finally undertaken. Under the command of Commodore Sir James Bisset, the ship travelled to the Isle of Arran and her trials were carried out. On board was the ship's namesake, Queen Elizabeth, and her two daughters, Princesses Elizabeth and Margaret. During the trials, Queen Elizabeth took the wheel for a brief time, and the two young princesses recorded the two measured runs with stopwatches that they had been given for the occasion. Bisset was under strict instructions from Sir Percy Bates, who was also aboard the trials, that all that was required from the ship was two measured runs of no more than 30 knots and that she was not permitted to attempt to attain a higher speed record than Queen Mary. Queen Elizabeths engines were capable of driving her to speeds of over 32 knots. After her trials Queen Elizabeth finally entered passenger service, allowing Cunard White Star to launch the long-planned two-ship weekly service to New York. Despite specifications similar to those of Queen Mary, Queen Elizabeth never held the Blue Riband, for Cunard White Star chairman Sir Percy Bates asked that the two ships do not try to compete against each other.

The ship ran aground on a sandbank off Southampton on 14 April 1947, and was re-floated the following day.

In 1955, during an annual overhaul at Southampton, England, Queen Elizabeth was fitted with underwater fin stabilisers to smooth the ride in rough seas. Two fins were fitted on each side of the hull. The fins were retractable into the hull to save fuel in smooth seas and for docking. On 29 July 1959, she was in a collision with the American freighter American Hunter in foggy conditions in New York Harbor and was holed above the waterline.

As passenger numbers declined, the liners became uneconomic to operate in the face of rising fuel and labour costs. For a short time the Queen Elizabeth, now under the command of Commodore Geoffrey Trippleton Marr attempted a dual role in order to become more profitable; when not plying her usual transatlantic route, which she now alternated in her sailings with the French Line's SS France, the ship cruised between New York and Nassau. For this new tropical purpose, the ship received a major refit in 1965, with a new Lido deck added to her aft section, enhanced air conditioning, and an outdoor swimming pool. With these improvements, Cunard intended to keep the ship in operation until at least the mid-1970s. However, the strategy did not prove successful, owing to the ship's deep draught, which prevented her from entering various island ports, her width, which prevented her from using the Panama Canal, and also her high fuel costs.

Cunard retired Queen Mary in 1967 and Queen Elizabeth completed her final Atlantic crossing to New York on 5 November 1968. The two liners were replaced with the new, more economical Queen Elizabeth 2.

Final years

In late 1968, Queen Elizabeth was sold to the Elizabeth Corporation, with 15% of the company controlled by a group of Philadelphia businessmen and 85% retained by Cunard. The new company intended to operate the ship as a hotel and tourist attraction in Port Everglades, Florida, similar to the planned use of Queen Mary in Long Beach, California. Elizabeth, as she was now called, arrived in Port Everglades on 8 December 1968 and opened to tourists in February 1969, well before Queen Mary, which opened two years later, in 1971. The vessel was sold to Queen Ltd of Port Everglades on 19 July 1969. However, the Elizabeth's retirement in Florida was not to last. The climate of southern Florida was much harder on Queen Elizabeth than the climate of southern California was on Queen Mary. There was some talk of permanently flooding the bilge and allowing the Queen Elizabeth to rest on the bed of the Intracoastal Waterway in Ft. Lauderdale harbour (Port Everglades) and remain open, but the ship was forced to close in August 1970, after losing money and being declared a fire hazard. The vessel was sold at auction in 1970 to Hong Kong tycoon Tung Chao Yung.

Tung, the head of the Orient Overseas Line, intended to convert the vessel into a university for the World Campus Afloat program (later reformed and renamed as Semester at Sea). Following the tradition of the Orient Overseas Line, the ship was renamed Seawise University, as a play on Tung's initials (C.Y.'s).

The ship was now under Hong Kong ownership, and she sailed to Hong Kong on 10 February 1971. This proved to be problematic, for the ship's engines and boilers were in poor condition after several years of neglect. The now retired Commodore Marr and a former chief engineer of the ship were hired by Tung as advisors for the journey to Hong Kong. Marr recommended that Seawise University be towed to the New Territories, but Tung and his crew were convinced that they could sail the ship there using just the aft engines and boilers. The planned several-week trip turned into months as the crew battled with boiler issues and a fire. An unplanned lengthy mid-voyage stopover allowed the new owners to fly spare parts out to the ship and carry out repairs before resuming the course to Hong Kong Harbour, where she arrived in July 1971.

With the £5 million conversion nearing completion, the vessel caught fire on 9 January 1972. These fires were set deliberately, as several blazes broke out simultaneously throughout the ship and a later court of inquiry handed down a cause of arson by person or persons unknown. The fact that C.Y. Tung had acquired the vessel for $3.5 million, and had insured it for $8 million, led some to speculate that the inferno was part of a fraud to collect on the insurance claim. Others speculated that the fires were the result of a conflict between Tung, a Chinese Nationalist, and Communist-dominated ship construction unions.

The ship was destroyed by the fire, and the water sprayed on her by fireboats caused the burnt wreck to sink in Hong Kong's Victoria Harbour. The vessel was finally declared a shipping hazard and dismantled for scrap between December 1974 and 1975. Portions of the hull that were not salvaged were left at the bottom of the bay. The keel, boilers and engines remained at the bottom of the harbour, and the area was marked as "Foul" on local sea charts, warning ships not to try to anchor there. It is estimated that around 40–50% of the wreck was still on the seabed. In the late 1990s, the last remains of the wreck were buried during land reclamation for the construction of Container Terminal 9. Position of the wreck: .

After the fire, Tung had one of the liner's anchors and the metal letters "Q" and "E" from the name on the bow placed in front of the office building at Del Amo Fashion Center in Torrance, California, which had been intended as the headquarters of the Seawise University venture; they later went on display with commemorative plaques in the lobby of Wall Street Plaza, 88 Pine Street, New York City. Two of the ship's fire warning system brass plaques were recovered by a dredger, and were displayed at The Aberdeen Boat Club in Hong Kong in an exhibit about the ship. The charred remnants of her last ensign were cut from the flagpole and framed in 1972, and still adorn the wall of the officers' mess of marine police HQ in Hong Kong. Parker Pen Company produced a special edition of 5,000 pens made from material recovered from the wreck, each in a presentation box; today these are highly collectible.

Following the demise of Queen Elizabeth, the largest passenger ship in active service became the 66,343 GRT , which was longer but with less tonnage than the Cunard liner.

In fiction
In 1959, the ship made an appearance in the British satirical comedy film The Mouse That Roared, starring Peter Sellers and Jean Seberg. While a troupe of invading men from "Grand Fenwick", a fictional European micro-nation, cross the Atlantic to 'war' with the United States, they meet and pass the far larger Queen Elizabeth, and learn that the port of New York is closed due to an air raid drill.

Ian Fleming set the climax to his 1956 James Bond novel Diamonds Are Forever on Queen Elizabeth. The 1971 film version starring Connery used the P&O liner  for the sequence.

The wreck was featured in the 1974 James Bond film The Man with the Golden Gun, as a covert headquarters for MI6. 

The wreck also featured in a flashback sequence in an episode of American Dragon: Jake Long.

References

Further reading
 
 
 
 
 
 Harvey, Clive, 2008, R.M.S. Queen Elizabeth The Ultimate Ship, Carmania Press, London,

External links

 Cunard Line White Star Line R.M.S. Queen Elizabeth
 The Great Ocean Liners: Queen Elizabeth
 RMS Queen Elizabeth story and picture
 Pathe newsreel of Queen Elizabeth being built

Ships built on the River Clyde
History of Hong Kong
Ocean liners
Passenger ships of the United Kingdom
Ships of the Cunard Line
Ship fires
Ships of Scotland
Shipwrecks in the South China Sea
Steamships
Maritime incidents in 1947
Maritime incidents in 1968
Maritime incidents in 1972
Troop ships of the United Kingdom
1938 ships
Troop ships
Shipwrecks of Hong Kong